Damien Vincent Denis Le Tallec (born 19 April 1990) is a French-Russian professional footballer who plays for  club Sochaux-Montbéliard. He is the younger brother of striker Anthony Le Tallec, and cousin of Florent Sinama Pongolle. Like his older brother, Le Tallec is a France youth international, first appearing with the under-15 team and has appeared in several tournaments around the world for his nation. He started as a second striker, with possibility to play on both wings. In later career, he has primarily played as a defensive midfielder, being capable of playing as a centre-back  since the time with Red Star Belgrade.

Club career

Early career
Le Tallec was born in Poissy. Like his older brother, Damien began his career at Le Havre joining the club at only five years of age. He spent a full decade at the club and began drawing interests from several clubs in Ligue 1. He eventually joined Stade Rennais F.C., who were known for the promising youth academy.

Rennes
Le Tallec quickly established himself at the club joining fellow prospects Yann M'Vila, Yohann Lasimant, Abdoul Camara, and Yacine Brahimi as the club's most promising players. The foursome were particularly instrumental in the club's successes on the youth level, helping their age groups win the 2006 edition of the under-16 Tournoi Carisport, as well as capturing the under-18 championship for the 2006–07 season, and also winning the Coupe Gambardella in 2008, scoring an impressive eight goals in seven matches. In the Coupe Gambardella final against Bordeaux, he scored the final goal in the team's convincing 3–0 victory. Following the 2006–07 season, on 11 August, Le Tallec, alongside teammates M'Vila and Camara, signed his first professional contract, agreeing to a three-year deal. He spent the entire season in the reserves, before being officially promoted to the senior squad and assigned the number 22 shirt for the 2008–09 season.

Though on the first-team, Le Tallec began the season with the club's Championnat de France amateur team. He appeared in 22 matches, scoring four goals, helping the side finish 1st among professional clubs in their group, thus qualifying for the playoffs, where they lost to Lyon in the semi-finals.

Borussia Dortmund
Following the season, news came that Le Tallec had become unsettled at Rennes, primarily due to his limited first-team opportunities at the club. Eager to begin his professional career, he was primarily linked to La Liga club Valencia and was reportedly in the process of joining the club, but due to a shake up in the club's front office, the move was put on hold and eventually called off. He was later linked with moves to German clubs Hertha BSC and VfB Stuttgart. Two months later, on 8 August 2009, another German club, Borussia Dortmund, announced that they had signed the player to a three-year contract and that he will be gradually introduced to the first team.

Nantes
On 31 January 2012, Le Tallec returned to France, signing with Nantes in Ligue 2.

Hoverla
The following two seasons, Le Tallec played with FC Hoverla Uzhhorod in the Ukrainian Premier League. The club had just won the second tier last season and were searching for reinforcements, among them, Le Tallec. Despite the fact that during the two seasons Le Tallec spent in Hoverla, Hoverla performed rather mid-down table, Le Tallec was regular and his performances caught the attention of numerous clubs.

Mordovia
In the summer of 2014, Le Tallec moved to Russia and signed with Premier League side FC Mordovia Saransk. Mordovia had just won the second tier and got promoted to the Premier League. Same as in Hoverla, at Mordovia, Le Tallec also performed regularly. By the winter-break of the 2015–16 season, coach Miodrag Božović, a specialist of Russian football as he had just spent 8 years coaching in Russian Premier League, was in held of Serbian side Red Star Belgrade, who were forming a strong team in order to take the title from their main rivals FK Partizan, who had become chronic winners in the last decade, and in that built-up of the team, Božović made a priority of signing both Mordovia players, Le Tallec and Mitchell Donald, and both ended up moving to Belgrade.

Red Star Belgrade
On 29 January 2016, Le Tallec signed a 2.5-year contract with Red Star Belgrade. In his league debut with Red Star less than a month later, he scored a goal against FK Mladost Lučani. At the end of his first season at Red Star, they won the Serbian championship and qualified for a berth in the Champions League qualifying rounds.

Having played most of the former season as central midfielder, along Mitchell Donald, since start of the 2016–17 season, Le Tallec was often adapted as central defender by Red Star coach Miodrag Božović. While with Red Star Belgrade, Le Tallec made 104 appearances and scored 7 goals in all competitions and won 2 Serbian SuperLiga titles, between 2016 and 2018. In May 2018, Le Tallec announced that he would leave the club definitely in the summer the same year, after the end of his contract.

Montpellier
On 20 June 2018, Le Tallec returned to his home country and signed with Ligue 1 club Montpellier.

AEK Athens
On 9 July 2021, Le Tallec was announced as the new signing of Greek Super League club AEK Athens, having signed a two-year contract, with the option for one more year extension once it's over.

On 12 September, he scored the opening goal with a header in the 7th minute against Ionikos, in a game which ended in a 3–0 win for the hosts.

Torpedo Moscow
On 30 August 2022, Le Tallec returned to Russia and signed with Torpedo Moscow. His contract with Torpedo was terminated by mutual consent on 13 January 2023.

Sochaux
On 31 January 2023, Le Tallec signed a contract with Sochaux-Montbéliard until 30 June 2024.

International career
Le Tallec has featured for all of France's national youth teams, beginning with the under-15 team, earning his first selection in March 2006. He was a member of the under-17 team that reached the semi-finals at the 2007 UEFA European Under-17 Football Championship, before losing to England. He scored two goals in the tournament, both of them in the same game against Germany. He later played with the same under-17 team at the 2007 FIFA U-17 World Cup held in South Korea. Le Tallec appeared in all five matches, scoring four goals, one against Haiti, a brace against Tunisia in the Round of 16, and one against Spain whom defeated France on penalties in the quarterfinals. In total with the under-17s, Le Tallec scored 14 goals in 18 appearances.

With the under-19 team, Le Tallec appeared in 15 matches, scoring 6 goals. He scored three of those goals during the qualification process for the UEFA U-19 Championship against the Republic of Ireland, Liechtenstein, and Romania. The victory over Romania assured qualification to the tournament. At the tournament, held in the Ukraine, Le Tallec appeared in all four matches, helping France reach the semi-finals before suffering defeat to England.

In 2019, he started the process of applying for citizenship of Russia (his wife is Russian, his son has dual Russian-French citizenship and they own a house in Moscow). Le Tallec said he would be honoured if he will be called up to the Russia national football team after the process is complete. In April 2020, he received permanent residency permit in Russia and said his citizenship application is 90% complete, but is taking longer than expected due to restrictions introduced during the COVID-19 pandemic in Russia. He officially received Russian citizenship on 9 October 2020. It was reported that he is not  eligible to play for the senior Russia team as he played in official international games for youth teams of France.

Career statistics

Club

Honours

Club
Rennes
Coupe Gambardella: 2008

Borussia Dortmund
Bundesliga: 2010–11

Red Star Belgrade
 Serbian SuperLiga (2): 2015–16, 2017–18

References

External links

 Damien Le Tallec at Staderennais.com 
 
 
 
 
 
 
 
 
 

1990 births
French people of Breton descent
Russian people of French descent
People from Poissy
Footballers from Yvelines
Naturalised citizens of Russia
Living people
French footballers
France youth international footballers
Russian footballers
Association football central defenders
Association football midfielders
Association football utility players
Stade Rennais F.C. players
Borussia Dortmund players
Borussia Dortmund II players
FC Nantes players
FC Hoverla Uzhhorod players
FC Mordovia Saransk players
Red Star Belgrade footballers
Montpellier HSC players
AEK Athens F.C. players
FC Torpedo Moscow players
FC Sochaux-Montbéliard players
Bundesliga players
3. Liga players
Regionalliga players
Ligue 2 players
Ukrainian Premier League players
Russian Premier League players
Serbian SuperLiga players
Ligue 1 players
Super League Greece players
French expatriate footballers
Expatriate footballers in France
Expatriate footballers in Germany
Expatriate footballers in Ukraine
Expatriate footballers in Russia
Expatriate footballers in Serbia
Expatriate footballers in Greece
French expatriate sportspeople in Germany
French expatriate sportspeople in Ukraine
French expatriate sportspeople in Russia
French expatriate sportspeople in Serbia
French expatriate sportspeople in Greece
Russian expatriate sportspeople in France
Russian expatriate sportspeople in Germany
Russian expatriate sportspeople in Ukraine
Russian expatriate sportspeople in Serbia
Russian expatriate sportspeople in Greece